The Saimaa ringed seal (Pusa hispida saimensis, Finnish: Saimaannorppa) is a subspecies and glacial relict of ringed seal (Pusa hispida). They are among the most endangered seals in the world, having a total population of only about 400 individuals. The only existing population of these seals is found in Lake Saimaa, Finland (hence the name). They have lived in complete isolation from other ringed seal species for around 9,500 years and have diverged into a morphologically and ecologically different subspecies of ringed seal. The population is descended from ringed seals that were separated from the rest when the land rose after the last ice age. This seal, along with the Ladoga seal and the Baikal seal, is one of the few living freshwater seals.

Distribution

Habitat 
The Saimaa ringed seal is endemic to their habitat in Lake Saimaa, Finland.
The freshwater lake freezes over between the months of November and May, leaving the seals both an ice habitat and an open water habitat. During summer months when the ice is melted, these islands provide ample space for the seals to molt and breed.

Range 
Saimaa ringed seals are named as such due to their only habitat being Lake Saimaa, Finland. Thus, their range is restricted only to the waters of Lake Saimaa and its surrounding banks.

Appearance

They are coloured dark gray, with a gray-black dorsal with circular white rings. The bottom of the seal is light gray. The Saimaa ringed seal is darker in color than any other ringed seal.

Diet 
The Saimaa ringed seal does not have an incredibly varied diet. They are generalist feeders and eat exclusively fish. The fish consumed consist primarily of small schooling fish averaging 8.6 cm in length and up to 21 cm in length, while it has been shown that the pups eat slightly smaller fish than the average. The majority of their diet consists of vendace, smelt, perch, and roach. The pups’ diet varies markedly from the adults in that their diet consists primarily of perch and roach found in the shallow water where they spend most of their time in their earlier months, while the adults consume more vendace and smelt.

It was believed for a long time that the Saimaa ringed seal was competing with the commercial and recreational fishing industries and there were bounties paid on them until the 1940s. However it has recently been proven that the Saimaa ringed seal has minimal to no effect on the fishing industry. They do not prey on the local endangered salmon species (Salmo salar m. Sebago, S. trutta m. lacustris, and Salvelinus alpines). Although they do prey on the valuable vendace population, the proportion of the vendace population to the amount consumed by the seals indicates that they do not compete with the local fishing industries.

Behavior

Reproduction
Saimaa ringed seals become mature between the ages of 4 and 6. Their pregnancy rate is between 80 and 95 percent. Ringed seals' gestation lasts 11 months. The Saimaa ringed seal's longevity is just over 20 years.

A study conducted from 1980-84 revealed that Saimaa ringed seals make burrowed dens close to the shore and they reproduce once a year due to their longevity.

Saimaa ringed seals have two kinds of lairs or dens; they have a haul out lair where no breeding takes place, and the breeding lair. Breeding lairs are located closer to the shore than haul out dens.

Diving
Diving is an important behavior for aquatic mammals as it is something they rely on for behaviors such as foraging and travelling. The duration of their dives increases from spring to autumn, which may be a result of food availability, but it is interesting because they are one of the few landlocked seal species. Many studies have been done to observe Saimaa ringed seal diving, which was discovered to last longer than expected. Their average time for a long dive was recorded at 15 minutes and it was believed to be an aerobic resting dive.

The average dive depth ranges from 10 to 15 m; however, their maximum dive depths were limited by environmental depth. The Saimaa ringed seal has also been observed to have seasonal hauling-out patterns. In May and June, when the seals are molting, they are observed to haul out both day and night; however, in late summer they are observed to haul out only at night.

The Saimaa ringed seal is able to complete its dives and navigate in its environment due to its highly developed vibrissae, also known as whiskers. Using their vibrissae, they are able to detect sound and pressure waves in their otherwise dark environment.

Conservation

The Saimaa ringed seal has been protected since 1955. In 1983, the population was between 100 and 150 seals. In 2005, it was about 270, but as a result of two unfavorable breeding seasons, 2006 and 2007, the number dropped down to 260. In 2013, the population was estimated at just over 300 and the population numbers were in a slight growth. The number of breeding-aged females was 87. It was thought that the immediate threat of extinction would be alleviated if the population grew to over 400 individuals. It is listed as endangered by the U.S. government under the Endangered Species Act.

In spring 2016, 79 pups were found, four of which were dead.

In order to protect the Saimaa ringed seal, there are voluntary fisheries restrictions in a part of their living areas. The most important form of restriction is a ban on fishing nets from April 15 till the end of June in about 15% of the lake; nearly all fishing is recreational. Bycatch mortality has, however, remained high with estimated mortality of 20–30 seals annually, most of them pups of the same year.

In 2010 the European Union required Finland to do more to protect the seals, particularly from net fishing. To reduce the by-catch mortality of seals aged over one year, the use of certain fishing methods has been banned since 2011, which included strong mesh nets, large fish traps, and fish-baited hooks, in the main part of the Saimaa ringed seal's habitat.

In 2016, one Act and Mutual Agreement between authorities and owners of fishing waters replaced earlier two acts. The fishing co-operatives get 1.7 euros per hectare to ensure that fishing limitations are followed. Net fishing (except of vendace nets) is forbidden between mid-April and end of June in certain areas, which have been drawn at 5km radius from nesting sites.

Breeding success of Saimaa ringed seal depends on sufficient ice and snow cover. The loss of snow and ice caused by the ongoing climate change poses a direct threat to them. Human-made snowdrifts have proved to be successful in improving seals' breeding success during winters with poor snow conditions. Snowdrifts were tested for three winters, and from 2014, they have been used regularly.  In addition, artificial lairs are also in development for winters when there is no snow on ice due to climate change. Conservation experts expect to produce 100 of these boxes for dispersal and maintenance by the local citizenry.  

Recent estimates place the current population at between 420 and 430 individuals.

The Saimaa ringed seal lives mainly in two Finnish national parks, Kolovesi and Linnansaari.  Strays have been seen in a much larger area, including Savonlinna centre.

Norppalive
Norppalive (literally "Seal Live") is a live webcast of the Saimaa ringed seal produced by WWF. It shows a live image of a place that is occasionally visited by a Saimaa ringed seal. The purpose of Norppalive is to raise awareness of the Saimaa ringed seal. In 2016, Norppalive gathered at its best 180,000 simultaneous viewers and a total of more than two million viewers. One of the most well-known ringed seals found in live broadcasts is Pullervo, which has gained the status of Finland's most famous Saimaa ringed seal.

References

External links

 US National Marine Fisheries Service Saimaa seal web page
 Norppalive, WWF Finland Saimaa ringed seal webcam (live in May; in Finnish)

Phocins
Pinnipeds of Europe
Ringed Seal
Endemic fauna of Finland